The 2017 FEI European Championships was held in Gothenburg, Sweden, from 21 to 27 August 2017. Equestrian competitions were held in four disciplines: jumping, dressage, driving and para-dressage. The main venues were Ullevi, Heden and Slottsskogen.

Medalists

Dressage

Jumping

Driving

Para-dressage

Medals table

References

External links
 Official site

Equestrian sports competitions in Europe
FEI-recognized competition
European
European Dressage Championships
Equestrian sports competitions in Sweden
International sports competitions in Gothenburg
FEI European Championships
International sports competitions hosted by Sweden
2010s in Gothenburg